Pelican Air Services was a trading name of Federal Air, an airline based in Johannesburg, South Africa. It now trades under the name Federal Air, and no longer uses the Pelican Air branding.

It operated scheduled services. Its main base was O.R. Tambo International Airport, Johannesburg, with hubs at Vilankulo Airport, Mozambique and at Kruger Mpumalanga International Airport.

History 

The airline was established by PWD Farquhar in the late 1990s in association with TTA Mozambique. In 2001 JF Pienaar joined the company (PWD Farquhar (67%) and JF Pienaar (33%)) and had 19 employees (at March 2007).

Destinations 

Pelican Air Services operated services from Johannesburg to Vilanculos, and onto the Bazaruto Archipelago in association with Mozambique airline, ASAS de Moçambique.

Fleet

As of 29 November 2009 the Pelican Air Services fleet included:

1 ATR 42-320 (which was operated by Solenta Aviation)

References 

Defunct airlines of South Africa
Airlines established in 2001
Airlines disestablished in 2009
2009 disestablishments in South Africa
Companies based in Johannesburg
South African companies established in 2001